Ramón Díaz Sánchez (born 10 December 1982) is a Spanish basketball coach. He is the head coach of Capitanes de Ciudad de México since the inception of the club in 2017.

Coaching career
Díaz Sánchez started his coaching career in Spain with CB Ciudad de Guadix in the Liga EBA, the national fourth tier. 

In the 2013–14 season, he was the assistant coach for Halcones de Xalapa in Mexico.

On 8 October 2017, Díaz Sánchez signed with Capitanes de Ciudad de México, a newly established team in Mexico City. In his first two seasons, he reached the LNBP finals with Capitanes, losing both.

References

Living people
1982 births
Spanish basketball coaches
Capitanes de Ciudad de México coaches
Spanish expatriate basketball people in Mexico
Sportspeople from Granada